Nada Mohamed Wafa Arakji (born 30 October 1994) is a Qatari swimmer. She competed in the 50 m freestyle at the 2012 Summer Olympics, becoming the first woman to represent Qatar at the Olympics. She served on the bid committee for Doha's bid to host the 2020 Summer Olympics.

Arakji's family is heavily involved in sports. She is the daughter of the former Qatar national football team goalkeeper and Al Sadd player Mohamed Wafa Arakji. She is a student at Carnegie Mellon University in Qatar.

She represented Qatar at the 2019 World Aquatics Championships held in Gwangju, South Korea. She competed in the women's 50 metre freestyle and women's 100 metre freestyle events. In both events she did not advance to compete in the semi-finals.

See also

Qatar at the 2012 Summer Olympics

References

1994 births
Living people
Qatari female swimmers
Olympic swimmers of Qatar
Swimmers at the 2012 Summer Olympics
Swimmers at the 2016 Summer Olympics
Qatari female freestyle swimmers